Major-General Robin Vincent Searby  (born 20 July 1947) is a former British Army officer who commanded 5th Division.

Military career
Educated at Leasam House School and the Royal Military Academy Sandhurst, Searby was commissioned into the 9th/12th Royal Lancers in 1968. After service in Germany, Northern Ireland and Oman, he was appointed Commanding Officer of his regiment in 1987. He was appointed Chief of Staff to the Director Royal Armoured Corps in 1989, Commander Royal Armoured Corps for 1 (British) Corps in 1991 and Commander of British Forces in the Former Republic of Yugoslavia in 1993. He went on to be 
President of the Army Officer Selection Board in 1993, General Officer Commanding 5th Division in 1996 and Senior British Loan Services Officer in Oman in 2000 before retiring in 2004.

In 2003 he was appointed colonel of the 9th/12th Royal Lancers.

In 2004 he was appointed Defence Co-ordinator with Libya under an agreement to advise and train members of the Libyan Army at Sandhurst. In 2010 he became the UK Prime Minister's adviser on counterterrorism for North Africa.

Family
In 1976 he married Caroline Angela Beamish; they have one son and two daughters.

References

1947 births
Living people
Companions of the Order of the Bath
British Army generals
9th/12th Royal Lancers officers
Graduates of the Royal Military Academy Sandhurst